The women's 10,000 metres event at the 2003 Asian Athletics Championships was held in Manila, Philippines on September 20.

Results

References

2003 Asian Athletics Championships
10,000 metres at the Asian Athletics Championships
2003 in women's athletics